Patrick-Carr-Herring House, also known as the Second Sampson County Courthouse, is a historic home located at Clinton, Sampson County, North Carolina.   It was built about 1904–1905, and is a two-story, three bay, double pile, Classical Revival / Greek Revival style frame dwelling with a low-pitched hip roof. It was originally built as a -story structure on tall brick piers in 1818, and enlarged to a full two stories in the Greek Revival style on a full one-story brick basement in the 1840s. It was moved to its present site, and remodeled, in 1904–1905, when the current Sampson County Courthouse was constructed. The front features a single-story wraparound porch with Tuscan order columns and bracketing.  Also on the property is a contributing smokehouse (c. 1904).

It was added to the National Register of Historic Places in 1993.

References

Houses on the National Register of Historic Places in North Carolina
Neoclassical architecture in North Carolina
Courthouses in North Carolina
Former courthouses in the United States
Greek Revival houses in North Carolina
Houses completed in 1905
Houses in Sampson County, North Carolina
National Register of Historic Places in Sampson County, North Carolina
1905 establishments in North Carolina